Mighty Morphin Power Rangers: The Movie is a 1995 American superhero film. It stars the ensemble cast of Karan Ashley, Johnny Yong Bosch, Steve Cardenas, Jason David Frank, Amy Jo Johnson, and David Yost alongside the villains cast from the original series and Paul Freeman as Ivan Ooze. Much like the television season that followed the release, it used concepts from the Japanese Super Sentai series Kyōryū Sentai Zyuranger, Gosei Sentai Dairanger and Ninja Sentai Kakuranger. It is the first Power Rangers production from Saban Entertainment not to feature any archived footage from Super Sentai. It is the first installment in Power Rangers film series. The film was released in between the second and third seasons of Mighty Morphin Power Rangers, but is incompatible with season three, which provides a different explanation for the Rangers gaining their Ninja Ranger powers and Ninjazords, indicating they are set in different continuities.

Filming took place in and around Bombo Quarry and Sydney, New South Wales, Australia. This film was released June 30, 1995 and grossed $66.43 million worldwide, but received mixed reviews from critics. The critics praised its action sequences and performances, but felt that the film was nothing more than a longer episode of the series with better special effects, pointing to the plot and screenplay as the main faults.

Plot
The Mighty Morphin Power Rangers participate with Bulk and Skull in a charity skydive for the Angel Grove observatory, in anticipation of Ryan's Comet which is scheduled to pass by in two days. Bulk and Skull miss the target landing zone and accidentally land at a construction site where a giant purple egg has been unearthed. Lord Zedd, Rita Repulsa, Goldar and Mordant arrive at the construction site and crack open the egg, releasing Ivan Ooze, a morphological being who ruled Earth 6,000 years ago before he was lured into a hyper-lock chamber and buried deep underground by Zordon and a group of young warriors. The Rangers find and confront him, but Ivan unleashes some ooze monsters on them. While the Rangers battle and successfully defeat them, the fight distracts them long enough to allow Ivan to escape and lay siege to the Command Center, incapacitating Zordon, and robbing the Rangers of their powers. As the Rangers return to the Command Center, they find it destroyed and Zordon, being outside his time warp, aging and dying.

Zordon's assistant Alpha 5 sends the Rangers to the distant planet Phaedos to obtain the Great Power and save Zordon. On the Moon, Ivan usurps Rita and Zedd, shrinking and trapping them in a snow globe, and forces Goldar and Mordant to be his servants, then sends his Tengu warriors to Phaedos and begins building an army. He uses children to bring his ooze to their parents, and it hypnotizes them into becoming his workforce to dig up his Ecto-Morphicons, twin war machines built during his reign. When Fred Kelman, a friend of the Rangers, discovers his father missing, he finds him working at the construction site and discovers Ivan's plans.

On Phaedos, the Rangers are almost killed by the Tengu but are rescued by Dulcea, Phaedos' Master Warrior. She initially tells them to leave for their safety, but after hearing of Zordon's plight, she agrees to help them and takes them to an ancient ruined temple where the Rangers will have to overcome obstacles to acquire the power of the Ninjetti. Dulcea awakens each Rangers' animal spirit; Aisha is the bear, Rocky is the ape, Billy is the wolf, Kimberly is the crane, Adam is the frog, and Tommy is the falcon. Upon being asked if she could join them, Dulcea informs the Rangers that she would begin to age as rapidly as Zordon is at the moment if she steps beyond the temple. She then shapeshifts into an owl to preserve her age. The Rangers make their way to the Monolith housing the Great Power, using their wits to defeat a live fossilized dinosaur skeleton, and then, the temple's Stone Gargoyle guardians, and retrieve the Great Power, restoring their suits.

On Earth, Ivan's Ecto-Morphicons are completely unearthed, and he unleashes them on Angel Grove, ordering the parents to walk off a cliff at the construction site. Fred recruits Bulk, Skull, and the other kids, who head to the construction site to save their parents. The Rangers return with their new animal-themed Ninja Zords and, after a difficult struggle, destroy one of Ivan's Ecto-Morphicons, Scorpitron. Ivan takes control of Hornitor and battles the Rangers himself as they combine their Zords to form the Ninja Megazord and later the Ninja Falcon Megazord. Meanwhile, the kids push the parents back while Fred, with help from Bulk and Skull, sprays them with a large amount of water. The Rangers lure Ivan into space and knock him right into the path of Ryan's Comet, which destroys him. Ivan's death breaks his spell on the parents, who are reunited with their children. The Rangers return to the Command Center but are distraught to find Zordon has died. They use the Great Power to restore the Command Center and resurrect Zordon, returning him to his time warp. Everything returns to normal in Angel Grove as a celebration is held at the Harbor with fireworks and a message saying "Thank You Power Rangers" which offends Bulk and Skull.

In a mid-credits scene, Goldar briefly lounges on Zedd's throne, being served by Mordant, only to panic when Zedd and Rita appear, having been released after Ivan was destroyed.

Cast
 Jason David Frank as Tommy Oliver, the White Ranger
 Amy Jo Johnson as Kimberly Hart, the Pink Ranger
 David Yost as Billy Cranston, the Blue Ranger
 Johnny Yong Bosch as Adam Park, the Black Ranger
 Karan Ashley as Aisha Campbell, the Yellow Ranger
 Steve Cardenas as Rocky DeSantos, the Red Ranger
 Paul Schrier as Farkas "Bulk" Bulkmeier
 Jason Narvy as Eugene "Skull" Skullovitch
 Paul Freeman as Ivan Ooze
 Gabrielle Fitzpatrick as Dulcea
 Nicholas Bell as Zordon
 Peta-Maree Rixon as Alpha 5
 Jean Paul Bell as Mordant
 Kerry Casey as Goldar
 Mark Ginther as Lord Zedd
 Julia Cortez as Rita Repulsa
 Jamie Croft as Fred Kelman
 Paul Goddard and Robert Simper as Construction workers.

Voices
 Kerrigan Mahan as Goldar
 Robert L. Manahan as Zordon
 Robert Axelrod as Lord Zedd
 Barbara Goodson as Rita Repulsa
 Richard Wood as Alpha 5
 Martin G. Metcalf as Mordant

Soundtrack

Mighty Morphin Power Rangers The Movie: Original Soundtrack Album is the licensed soundtrack to the film. It was released by Fox Records and Saban Records on June 8, 1995, on Audio CD and Compact Cassette.

Despite several of the songs heard in the movie being well known and older, the album featured the highest profile musical talent the series had been associated with up until that point. The music of Van Halen, They Might Be Giants, Devo, Red Hot Chili Peppers, Roxette, Dan Hartman, and Buckethead was used throughout the film. The single released to promote the soundtrack was Shampoo's Trouble, although the commercials for the film used both this and Snap's hit "The Power".

Track list
 The Power Rangers Orchestra – "Go Go Power Rangers"
 Red Hot Chili Peppers – "Higher Ground"
 Shampoo – "Trouble"
 Devo – "Are You Ready?!"
 Snap! – "The Power" produced by Snap!
 Fun Tomas (featuring Carl Douglas) – "Kung Fu Dancing"
 Van Halen – "Dreams"
 Dan Hartman – "Free Ride"
 They Might Be Giants – "SenSurround"
 Power Jet – "Ayeyaiyai" (Alpha Song)
 Graeme Revell – "Firebird"
 Aaron Waters (The Mighty Raw) – "Cross My Line" (Bonus Track)

Additional artists
"The Power Rangers Orchestra" consisted of Eric Martin of Mr. Big, renowned studio guitarist Tim Pierce, John Pierce of Pablo Cruise on bass, singer-pianist Kim Bullard, and Matt Sorum of Guns N' Roses and Velvet Revolver on drums. The solo on the track "Firebird" is performed by Buckethead.

Original score

Mighty Morphin Power Rangers The Movie: Original Motion Picture Score is the  soundtrack of the score to the movie, released by Varèse Sarabande  on June 6, 1995, on Audio CD and Compact Cassette. This release features most of the film score by composer Graeme Revell, except for the track called Firebird which he performed along with guitarists Carl Verheyen and Buckethead; this was included in the film's previous soundtrack. The score was performed by the West Australian Symphony Orchestra with orchestrator Tim Simonec conducting.

Track list
Prologue
Ivan Ooze
The Great Power/Ninja Power
The Tengu's Attack
Zordon is Dying
The Rangers on Phaedos
Dulcea to the Rescue
Journey to the Plateau
Summoning the Ninjetti/Ninja Ranger
Jurassic Ride
The Monolith
Battle With the Gatekeepers
Metamorphicons Confront the Rangers
The Megazord Battle
Leap to Our Doom
Power Rangers Triumph
Freddy to the Rescue
Zordon is Saved

Personnel
Produced by Graeme Revell
Executive Producer: Robert Townson
Music Orchestrated and Conducted by Tim Simonec
Additional Orchestrations by Ken Kugler, Larry Kenton and Mark Gasbarro
Performed by the West Australian Symphony Orchestra
Music Scoring Mixer: Dan Wallin
Assisted by Malcolm Luker
Music Editor: Josh Winget

Release

Theatrical
The film was released on June 30, 1995, by 20th Century Fox.

Marketing
Family entertainment center chain Discovery Zone promoted the release of the film by giving away Power Rangers Wrist Activators (with 33 messages) to customers who bought a Discovery Zone Summer Power Pass. Discovery Zone also gave away one of six Power Rangers Movie Challenge cards for free during each visit. This promotion lasted the entire summer.

Home media

The film was released on VHS and LaserDisc in late 1995 and then as a double feature with 1997's Turbo: A Power Rangers Movie on a double-sided DVD in 2001 by 20th Century Fox Home Entertainment. Bonus features included a theatrical trailer and a "Making Of" featurette. The film was then released separately on a single-sided DVD in 2003.

The film was re-released with different packaging on DVD in 2011. The film was then re-released in 2017 in a bundled set with Turbo: A Power Rangers Movie (this time as two single-sided DVD discs) to coincide with the reboot film Power Rangers.

On May 9, 2018, it was announced that Mighty Morphin Power Rangers: The Movie would be released on Blu-ray for the first time by Shout! Factory as an extra disc included in their 25th anniversary DVD steelbook box set of the Mighty Morphin Power Rangers TV series. Shout! Factory released a stand-alone Blu-ray Disc on June 4, 2019.

Reception

Box office
In its opening weekend, the film earned $17 million, coming in fourth behind Apollo 13, Pocahontas, and Batman Forever. It ultimately grossed $66.4 million against a $15 million budget, making it a financial success.

Critical response
On the review aggregator website Rotten Tomatoes, 32% of 37 critics gave the film a positive review, with an average rating of 4.4/10. The site's critics consensus reads, "For better and for worse -- too often the latter -- Mighty Morphin Power Rangers: The Movie captures the thoroughly strange aesthetic of the television series that inspired it." Metacritic gave the film a weighted average score of 40 out of 100, based on reviews from 21 critics, indicating "mixed or average reviews".  Audiences polled by CinemaScore gave the film an average grade of "A–" on an A+ to F scale.

Kevin Thomas of the Los Angeles Times thought it was characterized by "a barrage of spectacular special effects, a slew of fantastic monsters, a ferociously funny villain—and, most important, a refreshing lack of pretentiousness." Thomas lauded director Bryan Spicer for raising the quality of production values for a feature film adaptation of the TV series while maintaining a likable "comic-book look and sense of wonder" and wholesome high school characters parents would approve of.

Caryn James of The New York Times thought that story-wise, it resembles multiple episodes of the television series strung together with slightly better special effects, and that the result was loud, headache-inducing and boring for adults, but that children would enjoy it. James further stated that too much of its running time is spent showing the Rangers without their powers. Roger Ebert gave it only half a star out of a possible four stars, saying that it is "as close as you can get to absolute nothing and still have a product to project on the screen," comparing it to synthetic foods in brightly marketed packaging with no nutritional content. He felt that the characters, with the exception of Ivan Ooze ("curious that, 6 thousand years ago, he would have had an English name"), lacked personalities, and that the scenes of monsters rampaging through the city hearkened back to the worst Japanese monster films. Mick LaSalle of the San Francisco Chronicle found the fights "only adequately choreographed," called the battle in the climax "a complete disaster" and stating that it made no sense in timing, that protagonists were not very intelligent, and the actors playing them unremarkable.

Other media

Video games
Four different video game titles based on the film were released for the Super NES, Sega Genesis, Game Boy, and Game Gear.

Comic books
Marvel Comics released a comic book adaptation and a photo comic book adaptation of the film in September 1995. The comic book was printed with two different covers: one featuring fully morphed Rangers and the other featuring them in their Ninjetti uniforms.

Notes

References

External links

 

 
1990s American films
1990s action adventure films 
1990s English-language films
1990s science fiction adventure films
1990s science fiction action films
1990s superhero films
1990s teen fantasy films 
1995 directorial debut films
1995 films
1995 martial arts films
20th Century Fox films
American action adventure films
American children's adventure films
American children's fantasy films
American fantasy adventure films
American robot films
American science fantasy films
American science fiction action films 
American science fiction adventure films
American superhero films
American teen films
Films about magic
Films about shapeshifting
Films adapted into comics
Films based on television series
Films directed by Bryan Spicer 
Films produced by Shuki Levy
Films produced by Haim Saban
Films produced by Suzanne Todd
Films scored by Graeme Revell
Films set in California
Films shot at Village Roadshow Studios 
Films shot in Australia
Films shot in the Northern Territory
Films shot in Queensland
Films shot in Sydney
Martial arts fantasy films
Martial arts science fiction films
Mecha films
Mighty Morphin Power Rangers
Ninja films
Power Rangers films
Saban Entertainment films
Teen adventure films
Teen superhero films